"Blue bell: March Song and Chorus" is a march style song composed by Theodore F. Morse and written by Edward Madden. The song was published in 1904 by F.B. Haviland Pub. Co., in New York, NY.The cover, illustrated by Rose Starmer, depicts a soldier and a young woman. The song was recorded and popularized by Byron Harland and Frank Stanley, the Haydn Quartet, and Henry Burr.

The sheet music can be found at the Pritzker Military Museum & Library.

References

Bibliography
Tyler, Don. Hit songs, 1900-1955: American popular music of the pre-rock era. Jefferson, N.C.: McFarland, 2007. . 

1904 songs
Songs with music by Theodore F. Morse
Songs with lyrics by Edward Madden